The Canadian International Council (CIC) is a Canadian think tank on foreign relations. It is an independent, member-based council established to strengthen Canada's role in international affairs. Its goal is to advance debate on international issues across academic disciplines, policy areas, and economic sectors.

The council is headquartered in Toronto, Ontario, with 18 volunteer-run branches across Canada. CIC branches offers CIC members speakers' programs, study groups, conferences, and seminars. Branches are located in Calgary, Edmonton, Halifax, Hamilton, Montreal, Ottawa, Nipissing (North Bay), Prince George, Quebec, Regina, Saskatoon, Simcoe County, Thunder Bay, Toronto, Vancouver, Victoria, Waterloo, and Winnipeg. The volunteer-driven branches are the backbone of the organization. It's through the efforts of these many volunteers that the CIC engages Canadians from coast, to coast on current foreign affairs topics of importance to their local communities. It also established a pan-Canadian Young Professionals Network.

The CIC has established a digital media platform, OpenCanada.org, to promote discussion by Canadians on international affairs.

History
The CIC has its roots in 1928, in the Canadian Institute of International Affairs (CIIA), when it was founded by Sir Robert Borden. In 1932, Escott Reid was appointed as the Institute's first full-time National Secretary and began organizing annual study conferences where ideas could be exchanged. The conferences were largely round-table discussions and members of branch study groups were invited to participate. Reid also encouraged expansion of the CIIA's membership and greater public participation in the work of the Institute. The CIC's first corporate record dates back to 1950, with the objective "to give attention to Canada's position both as a member of the international community of nations and as a member of the British Commonwealth of Nations."

Under insurance magnate Edgar Tarr, 1931 to 1950, it went beyond the original neutral and apolitical research role. Instead it championed Canadian national autonomy and sought to enlarge the nation's international role, while challenging British imperialism.  Numerous diplomats attended its conferences and supported its new mission.  Canada's foreign policy moved away from imperialism and toward the sort of anti-colonialism promoted by the United States. CIIA leaders and Canadian officials worked to encouraged nationalist forces in India, China, and Southeast Asia that sought to reject colonial rule and Western dominance.

In October 2007, Jim Balsillie (the former co-CEO of the Canadian information technology company Research In Motion ('BlackBerry') initiated the formation of the CIC as a partnership between the CIIA and the Centre for International Governance Innovation (CIGI), a think tank based in Waterloo, Ontario, that works on global issues, in order to create a research base on Canadian foreign policy similar to the American Council on Foreign Relations and the United Kingdom's Royal Institute of International Affairs. In making the announcement, Balsillie wrote, "CIC will be a research-based, non-partisan vehicle. Applying expert and fact-based research to complex issues is the essential foundation for creating effective policy." In November 2007, members of the CIIA voted to become the Canadian International Council.

In May 2008, the Canadian Institute of Strategic Studies (CISS) folded its operations into the CIC as the Strategic Studies Working Group.

In 2019, the Couchiching Institute on Public Affairs was merged into the CIC, and continues as an annual Couchiching event which the CIC hosts.

In 2020, the online publication OpenCanada returned to the CIC after being under the management of the Centre for International Governance Innovation from 2015 to 2020.

Awards

The CIC has been recognized at the Canadian Online Publishing Awards for its work with OpenCanada. In 2013 the site won the Content of the Year award, as well as two gold medals for best overall online-only publication and online-only article or series in the academic and nonprofit media category.

Research

Foreign Policy by Canadians 

Foreign Policy by Canadians is a joint initiative by the Canadian International Council (CIC), CanWaCH and Global Canada. It is a national conversation for Canadians from all walks of life to convene and present their perspectives on Canada's foreign policy priorities for the 2020s. To understand the views of everyday citizens, CanWaCH and the CIC ran a deliberative democracy exercise with James S. Fishkin's Stanford Center for Deliberative Democracy . Using techniques developed by the Center for Deliberative Democracy, this project identified a representative sample of the entire Canadian population which was then briefed on the critical issues facing Canada in the world and deliberated on policy proposals meant for presentation to the Canadian government. The results will provide an indication of the level of support the broader Canadian electorate would have for global engagement if fully exposed to the issues at stake. This initiative is meant to bridge the gap between policy makers and Canadians from all walks of life to identify how Canada should engage the world.

Fellowship program 

The CIC's fellowship program attracts established researchers and foreign policy professionals, as well as Canada's most promising young minds, providing them with the opportunity to help guide Canada on pressing foreign policy issues. Open to academic, public policy, business, media and other professionals with international expertise, the CIC awards a limited number of fellowships across Canada each year, creating an interdisciplinary team of experts, each focused on a particular issue area. Working both independently and collectively, CIC fellows devote six to 12 months to working on a specific research project initiative, with the goal of creating new insights and policy-relevant findings.

Governance

The President and Research Director of the CIC is Ben Rowswell, former Ambassador to Venezuela from 2014 to 2017. The CIC is overseen by a board of directors chaired by former Minister of Foreign Affairs Bill Graham.

Publications

International Journal (IJ), established in 1946, is the CIC's scholarly publication and Canada's pre-eminent journal of global policy analysis. IJ is cross disciplinary, combining the insights of history, political science, and economics with anthropology and other social sciences to advance research and dialogue on issues of global significance.

In 2013 the CIC partnered with the Bill Graham Centre for Contemporary International History and SAGE Publications to publish International Journal.

The CIC also publishes Behind the Headlines. First published in 1940 as a pamphlet series focused on contemporary Canadian foreign policy, Behind the Headlines evolved first into a quarterly current affairs magazine, and then into its current form as a policy paper series.

Funding

The Canadian International Council is a non-for-profit organization and a registered charity with Canada Revenue Agency. Funding comes from private sponsorship, membership fees, donations, and events.

References

External links

International Relations and Digital Technology Project
International Journal

Political and economic think tanks based in Canada
Charities based in Canada
Non-profit organizations based in Toronto
Organizations established in 1928